The American Treaty Shore also known as the Anglo-American Convention of 1818 is an identification of the fishing area frequented by American fishing vessels around the coast of Newfoundland.

External links
The Avalon Project

Political history of Newfoundland and Labrador
1818 treaties
Water transport in Newfoundland and Labrador